"Derry's Walls" is a historical song sung in Northern Ireland. It commemorates the Siege of Derry in 1689.

The author of the words is unknown, and it is sung to the tune of "God Bless the Prince of Wales.”

A modified rendition is also popular amongst supporters of Rangers F.C.

Lyrics

Verse 1

The time has scarce gone round boys 
Three hundred years ago
When Rebels to old Derry's Walls 
Their faces dare not show
When James and all his rebel band 
Came up to Bishops Gate
With heart in hand, and sword and shield 
We forced them to retreat.

Chorus.

We'll fight and won't surrender
And come when duty calls,
With heart in hand, and sword and shield
We'll guard old Derry's Walls.

Verse 2

The blood did flow in crimson streams 
Through many a winter's night
They knew the Lord was on their side 
To help them in their fight
They Nobly stood upon the walls 
Determined not to die,
To fight and gain the victory 
And raise the Crimson high;

Chorus.

We'll fight and won't surrender
And come when duty calls,
With heart in hand, and sword and shield
We'll guard old Derry's Walls.

Verse 3

At last, at last, with one broad side,
Kind heaven sent their aid,
The boom that crossed, The Foyle was broke
And James he was dismayed
The banner, boys, that floated
Was run aloft with joy,
God bless the hands that broke the boom,
And saved the Apprentice Boys!

Chorus.

We'll fight and won't surrender
And come when duty calls,
With heart in hand, and sword and shield
We'll guard old Derry's Walls.

References

Year of song unknown
Culture of Northern Ireland
Rangers F.C. songs
Songwriter unknown